Decatur may refer to a number of places, streets, military establishments, schools, and others mostly named after Stephen Decatur:

Places in the United States 
 Decatur, Alabama, county seat of Morgan County
 Decatur metropolitan area, Alabama
 Decatur, Arkansas, a city 
 Decatur, Georgia, county seat of DeKalb County
 Decatur, Illinois, county seat of Macon County
 Lake Decatur, a reservoir in the city
 Decatur, Indiana, county seat of Adams County
 Decatur City, Iowa, a city in Decatur County
 Decatur, Kentucky, an unincorporated community in Russell County
 Decatur, Michigan, a village
 Decatur, Mississippi, county seat of Newton County
 Decatur, Missouri, a ghost town
 Decatur, Nebraska, a village
 Decatur, New York, a town
 Decatur, Ohio, an unincorporated community
 Decatur, Tennessee, county seat of Meigs County
 Decatur, Texas, county seat of Wise County
 Decatur, Washington, an unincorporated community
 Decatur, Wisconsin, a town
 Decatur County (disambiguation)
 Decatur Township (disambiguation)
 Decatur Island, one of the San Juan Islands in Washington state

Transportation
 Decatur Boulevard, Las Vegas, Nevada, a north–south thoroughfare
 Decatur Highway, U.S. Route 31 in Alabama between Decatur and Birmingham
 Decatur Street (disambiguation)
 Decatur (MARTA station), a railroad station in Decatur, Georgia

Military uses
 USS Decatur, several ships of the U.S. Navy
 Decatur (1813 ship), an American privateer of the War of 1812
 Fort Decatur, a fort in New York during the War of 1812

Other uses 
 Decatur (name), a list of people with either the surname or given name
 34351 Decatur, an asteroid
 Decatur High School (disambiguation)
 Arizona Charlie's Decatur, a casino hotel in Las Vegas
 "Decatur Psalm", a song from the 1996 album ATLiens by Outkast
 "Decatur", a song from the 1992 album Headsparks by Seam
 "Decatur, or, Round of Applause for Your Step Mother!", a song from the 2005 album Illinois by Sufjan Stevens

See also
 Decatur Subdivision, a former railroad line in Illinois and Indiana